Vocology is the science and practice of vocal habilitation, or vocal training and therapy. Its concerns include the nature of speech and language pathology, the defects of the vocal tract (laryngology), the remediation of speech therapy, and the voice training (voice therapy) and voice pedagogy of song and speech for actors and public speakers.

In its broadest sense, vocology is the study of voice, but as a professional discipline it has a narrower focus: the science and practice of voice habilitation, which includes evaluation, diagnosis, and intervention.

History

Vocology was invented (simultaneously, but independently) by Ingo Titze, and an otolaryngologist at Washington University in St. Louis, Prof. George Gates. Titze defines vocology as "the science and practice of voice habilitation, with a strong emphasis on habilitation". To habilitate means to “enable”, to “equip for”, to “capacitate”; in other words, to assist in performing whatever function that needs to be performed". He goes on that this "is more than repairing a voice or bringing it back to a former state ... rather, it is the process of strengthening and equipping the voice to meet very specific and special demands".

Requirements and educational programs

It is not yet its own professional degree, thus it only assists the voice medicine team. Usually a person practicing vocology is a voice coach with additional training in the voice medical arts, a prepared voice/singing teacher, or a speech pathologist with additional voice performance training—so they can better treat the professional voice user. The study of vocology is recognized academically by courses and institutes in India, Italy and the United States.

Colombia
 Vocology Center, Todo Comunica

India
 Chetana National Institute of Vocology

Italy
 Milan's  Azienda Ospedaliera Fatebenefratelli e Oftalmico, University Alma Mater Studiorum in Bologna

United States
 Grabscheid Voice Center at Mount Sinai Medical Center
 Indiana University Bloomington
 Lamar University
 National Center for Voice and Speech at the University of Utah offer an 8-week intensive course (9 graduate level university credits) and a Certificate in Vocology.
 Regional Center for Voice and Swallowing
 Rider University
 Vox Humana Laboratory at St. Luke's-Roosevelt Hospital Center
 University of Illinois at Urbana-Champaign
 University of Kansas
 University of Southern California Thornton School of Music
 Westminster Choir College

Korea, Republic of
 Korean Vocology Association

Reflecting the increased recognition of vocology, the Scandinavian Journal of Logopedics & Phoniatrics and Voice merged in 1996 with the new name Logopedics, Phoniatrics, Vocology.  Additionally, a new association bearing the name of vocology (Pan-American Vocology Association) has also been started.

See also 
 Human Voice
 Speech
Vocal loading
Vocal fry
Vocal rest
Vocal range
Vocal warm up
Voice analysis
Voice disorders
Voice frequency
Voice organ
Voice pedagogy
Voice projection
Voice synthesis

References

Further reading

External links 

 Pan-American Vocology Association
 Logopedics Phoniatrics Vocology (the journal of the Nordic Cooperation Council of Logopedics and Phoniatrics and The British Voice Association)
 National Center for Voice and Speech
 The NCVS's Summer Vocology Institute website-- Certificate in Vocology
 University of Kansas Vocology Lab
 Vocology Center, Todo Comunica
 Westminster Choir College
 American Speech-Language-Hearing Association
 National Institute on Deafness and Other Communication Disorders (NIDCD) 

Speech and language pathology
Singing